The 1922–23 Montreal Canadiens season was the team's sixth season in the NHL and 14th overall. The Canadiens finished second in the league and reached the NHL finals, losing to the eventual Stanley Cup champions, the Ottawa Senators. It also marked the debut of Aurèle Joliat, who would spend the next sixteen years with the club.

Preseason

Regular season

Final standings

Record vs. opponents

Schedule and results

Player statistics

Skaters
Note: GP = Games played; G = Goals; A = Assists; Pts = Points; PIM = Penalty minutes

Goaltenders
Note: GP = Games played; Min = Minutes; W = Wins; L = Losses; T = Ties; GA = Goals against; SO = Shutouts; GAA = Goals against average

Playoffs
They went against Ottawa for the championship and lost 3 goals to 2, or 2–3.

Transactions

References

Montreal Canadiens seasons
Montreal
Montreal